Mylai Ponnuswamy Sivagnanam, popularly known as Ma.Po.Si. (26 June 1906 – 3 October 1995), was an Indian politician, freedom fighter, and the founder of the political party Tamil Arasu Kazhagam. He wrote more than 100 books.

Biography
Ma.Po.Si. was born on 26 June 1906 of humble parentage in Salvankuppam in Thousand Lights of Madras City, to God –fearing Parents, Ponnuswamy and Sivagami a counterpart of the Nadars of the Southern Districts. For long, Sivagnanam was known as Sivagnanam Gramani, which denominational suffix he shed later. His early education was through his devout mother, and his school term ended at the commencement of Standard III, due to poverty, his father could not buy for him the class text books. Thereafter, the wide world was his school. Sivagnanam was the eldest of the surviving three of his parents’ ten children. Sivagnanam worked on daily wage for some time and later as a weaver for eight years. Subsequently, he started life as a compositor in the Press of a Tamil Journal.

He was elected to the Tamil Nadu Legislative Assembly from Thiyagarayanagar constituency contesting as a DMK contestant in 1967. His participation in the demarcation of Tamil Nadu has made him an important figure in the state’s history. It was through his efforts the state could retain Madras(now renamed as Chennai) and got Tiruttani from Andhra Pradesh (due to his 'the namade vs manade' agitation) . He was the chairman (presiding officer) of Tamil Nadu Legislative Council when it was abolished by M. G. Ramachandran in 1986.

Fight for Retention of Madras (Chennai) as Tamil Nadu state capital

Potti Sreeramulu started an agitation for separate Andhra Pradesh. As part of this 'Madras Manade' movement was started, asking for Madras to be the capital of separated Andhra Pradesh. Ma.Po.Si. through his Tamil Arasu Kazhagam agitated against Telugus' claim organising rallies, meetings and dharnas etc., saying 'தலை கொடுத்தேனும் தலைநகரைக் காப்போம்' (We will protect and save the capital for Tamils even if we have to part with our heads). Leaders like C. Rajagopalachari supported Ma.Po.Si.

Ma.Po.Si. went to meet Sreeramulu during his fast, due to the high respect he had on him, amidst political differences. Andhra Kesari Prakasam who was with Sreeramulu told Ma.Po.Si. that they want to keep Madras as their temporary capital. Ma.Po.Si. denied his request. Ma.Po.Si. through his Tamilasrasu Kazhagam held massive protests for want of Madras within Tamil Nadu. He was even imprisoned at times for this. Sreeramulu died during a fatal fast, which increased more sympathy towards Andhra's demand. 'Madras Manade ' movement attained more momentum. 

Nehru appointed Vansu, a Rajasthan-based justice to look into the Madras issue. Rajaji pressured Nehru saying if Madras was given to Andhra, he will resign from his post. Ma.Po.Si. submitted historical, literature facts to Vansu explaining the reason why he claims Thiruthani, Thirupathi, Madras to be grouped within Tamil Nadu. In between Nehru got an opportunity to read the famous speech Ma.Po.Si. rendered in Madras Corporation. Two thousand telegrams were sent to Nehru from Tamil Nadu, emphasizing the need for Madras within Tamil Nadu. Finally Madras was attached to Tamil Nadu by the great efforts of Ma.Po.Si.But Tirupati only left.

Madras (Chennai) Corporation Symbol

During the British period the Madras Corporation flag had the ‘sea,boat ,3 lions and 2 fishes’.The 3 lions represented the British and the sea,boat,fishes denoted the seashore of madras.After Independence, the need for changing the flag arose. M.P.Sivagnanam who was heading the education wing of the corporation suggested the Pandiya,Chola,Chera’s symbol ‘Fish,Tiger and Bow’ (which he already had in his ‘Tamil arasu kazhagam’s flag). Rajaji agreed with his suggestion.

Literature

Inspired by Subramanya Bharathi
It was in Amaravathi prison where Ma.Po.Si. started his literary journey. His interest to sangam literature was kindled by the words of Subramanya Bharathi. He claimed that the simple words of Bharathi acted as a tutor to take him to the next literary level. He attributed all his literary growth to Subramanya Bharathi.Ma.Po.Si. is one of the authors to have written about 10 research books on Bharathi.

Books written by Ma.Po.Si. on Subramanya Bharathi
Vallalarum Bharathiyum (1965)
Engal Kavi Bharathi (1953)
Bharathiyum Aangilamum (1961)
Bharathi Kanda Orumaipadu (1962)
Ulaga Mahakavi Bharathi (1966)
Bharathiyar Pathaiyile (1974)
Bharathiyin Porkural (1979)
Bharathy Patri Ma.Po.Si. Perurai (1983)
Tholkappiathilirunthu Bharathi varai (1979)
Ennai Valartha Bharathi (2013) by Vikraman

Silapathikaram
He started reading Silapathikaram and got induced into it. He took the morals dictated by Silapathikaram as his bible ad enforced his party's principles based on the same. He was the one, who pioneered spreading the merits of Silapathikaram. Ma.Po.Si.’s extensive research on Silapathikaram earned him the special title "Silambu Chelvar" by R. P. Sethu Pillai. His attraction towards this epic even made him name his daughters Kannagi and Madhavi.

Books written by Ma.Po.Si. on Silapathikaram
Silappatikaramum Thamizharum (1947)
Kannagi Vazhipadu (1950)
Illangovin Silambu (1953)
Veerakanagi (1958)
Nenjaiallum Silappatikaram (1961)
Madhaviyin Manbu (1968)
Kovalan Kutravaliya (1971)
Silappatikara Thiranaivu (1973)
Silappatikara Yathirai (1977)
Silappatikara Aayvurai (1979)
Silappatikara Uraiasiriyargal Sirappu (1980)
Silappatikarathil Yashum Esaiyum (1990)
Silambil Edupatathu eppadi (1994)

Silapathikara Vizha

Ma.Po.Si. wanted to spread the merits of Silapathikaram throughout the world. He conducted the 'Silapathikara Vizha' in 1950 for the first time in Tamil History. It was held in Congress Grounds,Madras,Tamil Nadu.The ceremony consisted of eminent Tamil scholars from all Tamil parties. From 1950 onwards Ma.Po.Si.'s Tamil Arasu Kazhagam started celebrating the Silpathikara Vizha every year.

After Ma.Po.Si.'s demise, his daughter Ma.Po.Si. Madhavi Baskaran started celebrating Silapathigara Vizha in 2013,through a Trust run by her in the name of her father.

V.O. Chidambaram Pillai
Ma.Po.Si. brought out the contribution of V.O. Chidambaram Pillai to the masses. He wrote V.O.Chidambaram Pillai's biography and named it as 'Kappalottiya Thamizhan'. Later V.O.Chidambaram Pillai was remembered by all as 'Kappalottiya Thamizhan'.A Tamil movie named Kappalottiya Thamizhan directed by B.R.Panthulu was taken based on Ma.Po.Si.'s biography.

Books written by Ma.Po.Si. on V.O. Chidambaram Pillai
Kappalottiya Thamizhan (1944)
Kappalottiya Chidambaranar (1972)
Thalapathy Chidambaranar (1950)

Veerapandiya Kattabomman
Ma.Po.Si. was instrumental in reviving the public interest of Kattabomman through his biography he wrote. Later a Tamil movie named 'Veerapandiya Kattabomman (film)' was made which made Kattaboman more popular. Ma.Po.Si. wrote the screenplay for this movie.

Books written by Ma.Po.Si. on Veerapandiya Kattabomman

Veerapandiya Kattabomman (1949)
Kayathatril Kattabomman (1950)
Suthanthira Veeran Kattabomman (1950)

Thiruvalluvar

Books written by Ma.Po.Si. on Thiruvalluvar
Thirukuralil Kalai Patri Kurathathen(1974)
Valluvar Thantha Vazhi(1952)
Thiruvalluvarum Karl Marxum(1960)

Books of Ma.Po.Si. translated in English

 The Great Patriot V.O. Chidambaram Pillai
 The First Patriot Veera Pandia Katta Bomman 
The Universal Vision of Saint Ramalinga

He was the editor of "Senkol" which became the vehicle of his ideas on matters of political and literary.

In 1966, he was awarded the Sahitya Akademi Award for Tamil for his biography of Vallalar – Vallalar kanda orumaipaadu. In 1972, Government of India awarded him Padma Shri for Literature & Education.

Educational service
1952–53 Chairman, Education Committee, Corporation of Madras.
1952–54 Member, Senate of Madras University
1957–69 Member, Senate of Madurai Kamaraj University
1972–76 Member, Syndicate of Madras University
1978 Member, Senate of Annamalai University
1981 Delivered Convocation Address in the Rural University, Gandhigram, Tamil Nadu
Chairman of several committees, commissions constituted by the Madras University .

Various books written by him such as Veerapandia Kattabomman, Kappalottiyathamizhan, Vallalar Kanda Orumaippaadu, KambanKaviyinbam, Kalingaththu parani, Bharathiyaarin Paadhaiyile etc.,have been prescribed as text books for High Schools, colleges and as Reference books for Post-Graduates courses.

Library movement
1952–54 Chairman, Madras District Local Library Authority
1970–73 Chairman, Madras District Local Library Authority, 2nd time
1972–74 Member, Tamil Nadu State Local Library Authority Responsible for the creation of separate department and Director for Librariesin Tamil Nadu and also for increasing the Library Cess from 3 paise to 5 paise.

Visits abroad
1948 First visited Ceylon and toured for 28 days
1956 Visited Burma and toured for 18 days
1964–65 Visited Malaysia and Singapore twice
1965 Visited Kulalampur and participated as the representative of Government of Tamil Nadu in the World Tamil Conference held at Kulalumpur
1970 Participated as the representative of Government of Tamil Nadu in The World Tamil Conference held at Paris
1970 Visited Soviet Union and toured for seven days at the invitation of Soviet Union
1970 Visited London and stayed for three days on his way back to India from Paris and studied the working of Library Movement and Police Administration
1986 Visited London and United States of America for over three weeks.Toured various places in America and participated in World Peace Conference in Virginia

Awards and honours

1950  Awarded title "Silambu Selvar" by Prof. R.P.Sethupillai
1966  "Sahithya Academy Award" for the book written by him Vallalarkanda Orumaipadu
1970  Award given by UNESCO Mandram, Madras during International Education Year
1972  ‘Padmashri’ Award by the President of India
1976  ‘Kalaimamani’ title by Tamil Nadu Iyal,Isai, Nataka Mandram, Madras
1979  “Doctor of Literature” by the University of Madras
1979  “Doctor of Literature” by the Annamalai University, Chidambaram, Tamil Nadu
1980  Tamil Nadu Government has awarded a prize for the book written by his namely, "Enathu Porattam" containing 1200 pages. This book was released by the erstwhile President of India Thiru. V.V.Giri.
1985  The book " Viduthalai Poril Thamizhagam" was nationalized by the Tamil Nadu Government
1985  Award of ‘Peravai chemmal’ by Madurai Kamarajar University
2006  Hon'ble Chief Minister of Tamil Nadu Dr. Kalaignar M. Karunanidhi on 15 August Tuesday 2006 released commemorative postage stamp issued by the Department of Posts on freedom fighter and Tamil scholar Silambu Chelvar M.P. Sivagnanam (Ma.Po.Si.) .
2006  Books of Ma.Po.Si. Nationalized by the Tamil Nadu Government.
2011  Statue of Ma.Po.Si. unveiled in Thyagaraya Nagar (T.Nagar, Chennai)

References

External links

Silambu Selvar Padmashri Dr.Ma.Po.Si Trust
Thamizharasu Kazhagam
Kappalottiya Thamizhan
Veerapandiya Kattabomman
Silapathikaram
Gramani Community
http://maposi.com
Silapathikaram website
History of Chennai
Silappathikara Vizha-Ma.Po.Si 20th Memorial
54th Anniversary of Thiruthani
http://www.maposi.co.in
Silambu Selvar Trust Inauguration 
106th Birthday Celebrations of Silambu Selvar -Daily Thanthi
106th Birthday Celebrations of Ma.Po.Si Dinamalar
Death Anniversary Celebrations of Ma.Po.Si Dinathanthi
107th Birthday Celebration of Ma.Po.Si 
17th Death Anniversary of M.P.Sivagnanam 

Members of the Tamil Nadu Legislative Assembly
1906 births
1995 deaths
Recipients of the Padma Shri in literature & education
Recipients of the Sahitya Akademi Award in Tamil
Members of the Tamil Nadu Legislative Council
Indian independence activists from Tamil Nadu